Cameron Bridge railway station served the village of Cameron Bridge, Fife, Scotland from 1854 to the 1990s on the Fife Coast Railway.

The line and station are scheduled to be reopened by 2024 as part of the Levenmouth rail link, a £70 million project funded by the Scottish Government. The reopened station will be situated to the east of the original station and will have two platforms.

History

Original station
The station opened on 10 August 1854 by the Leven Railway. It was situated near Cameron Bridge Distillery, for which there were many sidings, and to the east of the level crossing on the road to Kirkcaldy and Cupar. The Muiredge Branch to the south also served a few collieries and Muiredge Goods. The station closed to passengers on 6 October 1969 but the distillery sidings operated until the 1990s.

Reopening
In December 2020, the site for the new station was confirmed. Construction started in January 2023.

References

External links 

Disused railway stations in Fife
Former North British Railway stations
Railway stations in Great Britain opened in 1854
Railway stations in Great Britain closed in 1969
1854 establishments in Scotland
Proposed railway stations in Scotland